Cass City is a village in Elkland Township, Tuscola County in the Flint/Tri-Cities area of the U.S. state of Michigan. The population was 2,428 at the 2010 U.S. Census and 2,643 at the 2000 U.S. Census (a decrease of about 8%). Cass City is surrounded by several communities including Colwood, Deford, Elmwood and Ellington.

History
The village and the nearby Cass River are both named after General Lewis Cass, the territorial governor of Michigan in the earlier 19th century and the Democratic nominee for President of the United States in 1848.  It is currently within Michigan's 10th congressional district.

A sawmill was established at this location in 1851. Farming settlers first came here in 1855. Cass City was incorporated as a village in 1883.

Geography

Climate
This climatic region has large seasonal temperature differences, with warm to hot (and often humid) summers and cold (sometimes severely cold) winters.  According to the Köppen Climate Classification system, Cass City has a humid continental climate, abbreviated "Dfb" on climate maps.

Demographics

2010 census
As of the census of 2010, there were 2,428 people, 1,024 households, and 627 families living in the village. The racial makeup of the village was 96.9% White, 0.2% African American, 0.5% Native American, 0.5% Asian, 0.2% from other races, and 1.7% from two or more races. Hispanic or Latino of any race were 2.5% of the population.

There were 1,024 households, of which 29.1% had children under the age of 18 living with them, 44.8% were married couples living together, 12.2% had a female householder with no husband present, 4.2% had a male householder with no wife present, and 38.8% were non-families. 33.2% of all households were made up of individuals, and 18.2% had someone living alone who was 65 years of age or older. The average household size was 2.26 and the average family size was 2.88.

The median age in the village was 43.7 years. 21.9% of residents were under the age of 18; 7.6% were between the ages of 18 and 24; 21.8% were from 25 to 44; 25.8% were from 45 to 64; and 22.9% were 65 years of age or older. The gender makeup of the village was 47.0% male and 53.0% female.

2000 census
As of the census of 2000, there were 6,481 people, 4,670 households, and 3,892 families living in the village.

There were 1,670 households, out of which 38.7% had children under the age of 18 living with them, 49.3% were married couples living together, 12.8% had a female householder with no husband present, and 35.2% were non-families. 32.0% of all households were made up of individuals, and 16.5% had someone living alone who was 65 years of age or older.  The average household size was 2.31 and the average family size was 2.91.

In the village, the population was spread out, with 34.3% under the age of 18, 8.2% from 18 to 24, 24.9% from 25 to 44, 21.4% from 45 to 64, and 12.2% who were 65 years of age or older.  The median age was 40 years. For every 100 females, there were 86.1 males; for every 100 females age 18 and over, there were 79.1 males 18 and over.

The median income for a household in the village was $33,397, and the median income for a family was $41,289. Males had a median income of $31,714 versus $24,853 for females. The per capita income for the village was $17,159.  About 8.1% of families and 10.8% of the population were below the poverty line, including 16.4% of those under age 18 and 7.1% of those age 65 or over.

Economy
Agriculture is a central part of the Cass City economy, along with a small amount of industry (including Walbro Corp.).

Arts and culture

Library
Cass City is the home of the Rawson Memorial Library, a district library that serves Cass City, Elkland Township, Elmwood Township and Novesta Township. The library also contracts with Ellington Township, Evergreen Township, Grant Township and Greenleaf Township for library services.  The library started in 1910 as a project of a local Women's Study Club and was reorganized in 1966 as the Cass City and Elkland Township Library, a district library.

The library maintains online archives of two local newspapers, the Cass City Chronicle (published since 1899) and the Cass City Enterprise (published 1881-1906).

In 2007, Rawson Memorial Library was the recipient of the 2007 State Librarian's Excellence Award for exemplary public service.  It was recognized for creating its own online bookstore, a traveling Business Resource Center, home delivery, one-on-one computer training, and a "very successful young-adult section" with "more than 750 books, magazines and paperbacks and seating for 14 people."

Education
Cass City is home to one of the campuses of the Baker College System, with programs that include the Accelerated Bachelor of Business degree as well as classes in health science, early childhood education, and automotive services technology. Public schools are managed by Cass City Public Schools.

Notable people 

 Larry MacPhail, Hall of Fame executive with Major League Baseball; born in Cass City  
 Brewster H. Shaw, NASA astronaut, a U.S. Air Force colonel, and executive at Boeing; born in Cass City

In popular culture
Parts of the 1983 film Going Back were filmed in and around Cass City. The marquee of the historic Cass movie theater appears in one of the film's segments.

References

External links

Villages in Tuscola County, Michigan
Villages in Michigan
1883 establishments in Michigan